Although twenty-cent coins were required during the reign of King George V, arrangements were being made to replace the denomination. The Ottawa Mint was going to start producing Newfoundland’s coins and Canadians did not like the Newfoundland twenty-cent piece. Newfoundland coins circulated throughout Canada as well and the Newfoundland twenty-cent coin was often confused with Canadian twenty-five cent coins. The Canadian government convinced Newfoundland’s government to discontinue the twenty-cent coin. A twenty-five coin was introduced and struck on the same standard as the corresponding Canadian coin. The obverse of the coin was exactly the same as that of the Canadian twenty-five cent coin.

Specifications

Mintages

References

 0.25
Twenty-five-cent coins